Langøy can refer to:

Places
Langøy, Møre og Romsdal, a village in Averøy municipality in Møre og Romsdal county, Norway
Langøy, Telemark, an island in Kragerø municipality in Telemark county, Norway
Langøy, or Lang Island (Antarctica), an island in Antarctica

People
Leif-Arne Langøy (born 1956), a Norwegian businessperson

See also
Langøya, a large island located in Nordland county, Norway
Langøyene, "the Langøy islands" in Oslo, Norway